Marcus Wimberly (born July 8, 1974) is a former American football defensive back. He played for the Atlanta Falcons in 1997 and for the Memphis Maniax in 2001. Wimberly is currently the head coach of orangepark highscool(Fl)|orangepark High School]] in [[orange park
, florida]].

References

1974 births
Living people
American football defensive backs
Miami Hurricanes football players
Atlanta Falcons players
Memphis Maniax players